Mohd Sharbinee Allawee bin Ramli (born 7 December 1986) is a Malaysian footballer who plays as a goalkeeper for Sarawak United. At international level, he has so far represented his country as Malaysia national team goalkeeper from 2009–2011.

Club career

Terengganu
Sharbinee debuted with his state team Terengganu in 2006. He then became the first choice goalkeeper for Terengganu for six years. Although Sharbinee is one of the top goalkeepers in Malaysia, he also was criticised for his mistakes that gifts goals to opponents, such as his mistake in 2011 Malaysia Cup final against Negeri Sembilan.

Selangor
After six years playing for Terengganu, Sharbinee signed a one-year contract with Selangor in the 2013 Malaysia Super League season, reuniting with his former coach in Terengganu, Irfan Bakti Abu Salim. He made his debut for Selangor in the league match against Pahang on 19 January 2013. 

Sharbinee spent the entire season as the Selangor's second choice goalkeeper behind Norazlan Razali and returned to Terengganu for the 2014 season.

Kuala Lumpur
On 27 May 2018, Sharbinee signed a contract with Kuala Lumpur after being released from Terengganu. He made his debut for Kuala Lumpur on 2 June 2018 in a 3–0 win over Terengganu.

Pahang
Sharbinee played for the Pahang FA football team in 2020 and made only six appearances that year for the team.

Sarawak United
Sharbinee joined Sarawak United in 2021, just one week before the start of the 2021 Malaysia Premier League season.

International career 
Sharbinee was a member of the 2009 Laos Sea Games Football Gold medal winning squad.

In November 2010, Sharbinee was called up to the Malaysia national team by coach K. Rajagopal for the 2010 AFF Suzuki Cup. Sharbinee was in the first eleven against Indonesia in Group A first match. He conceded five goals as Malaysia lose 5–1. As a result, Sharbinee was then replaced by Khairul Fahmi Che Mat as the main goalkeeper for the later games, as Malaysia won the 2010 AFF Suzuki Cup title for the first time in their history. 

Sharbinee conceded five goals against Singapore in the first leg of 2014 FIFA World Cup qualification second round as Malaysia lose 5–3 in July 2011.

Career statistics

Club

International

Honours

Club
Terengganu
Malaysia FA Cup: 2011

International
Malaysia U-23
 2009 SEA Games: Gold

Malaysia
AFF Suzuki Cup: 2010

References

External links
 

Living people
1986 births
People from Terengganu
Terengganu FC players
Selangor FA players
Kuala Lumpur City F.C. players
Sarawak United FC players
Malaysia Super League players
Malaysian footballers
Malaysia international footballers
Association football goalkeepers